Scansano is a town and comune, of medieval origin, in the   province of Grosseto, Tuscany, central Italy. The area which Scansano lies within is called Maremma.

Scansano area is home to the production of Morellino di Scansano, a type of wine.

Frazioni 
The municipality is formed by the municipal seat of Scansano and the villages (frazioni) of Baccinello, Montorgiali, Murci, Pancole, Poggioferro, Polveraia, Pomonte and Preselle.

References

 
Wine regions of Italy